Requejo is a municipality located in the province of Zamora, Castile and León, Spain.

According to the 2004 census (INE), the municipality has a population of 164 inhabitants.

Named after the family in control at the time The Manrique De Lara Family (According to The Lara Family Crown and Nobility in Medieval Spain by  Simon R. Doubleday), whose closer relatives branched out into the Requejo family. The family was a wealthy ally to the area supplying farms and thorough leadership in the early 1600s. The last remaining member of the lineage able to request countship candidacy is Giselle Estela Requejo Manrique de Lara De Peña; who holds the legacy of a Spanish countship from extinction in her hands.

References

Municipalities of the Province of Zamora